In mathematics, more specifically general topology, the rational sequence topology is an example of a topology given to the set of real numbers, denoted R.

To give R a topology means to say which subsets of R are "open", and to do so in a way that the following axioms are met:

 The union of open sets is an open set.
 The finite intersection of open sets is an open set.
 R and the empty set ∅ are open sets.

Construction 

Let x be an irrational number (cf. rational number). Take a sequence of rational numbers {xk} with the property that {xk} converges, with respect to the Euclidean topology, towards x as k tends towards infinity. Informally, this means that each of the numbers in the sequence get closer and closer to x as we progress further and further along the sequence. 

The rational sequence topology is given by defining both the whole set R and the empty set ∅ to be open, defining each rational number singleton to be open, and using as a basis for the irrational number x, the sets

References

General topology